Brigette Tapene (born 1985) is a New Zealand netball player in the ANZ Championship, playing for the Waikato/Bay of Plenty Magic.

References
ANZ Championship profile

1985 births
Living people
New Zealand netball players
Waikato Bay of Plenty Magic players
ANZ Championship players